Carthage High School may refer to:

Carthage High School (Arkansas) — Carthage, Arkansas
Carthage High School (Illinois) (now Illini West High School) — Carthage, Illinois
Carthage High School (Carthage, Mississippi) (now Leake Central High School) — Carthage, Mississippi
Carthage Senior High School (Carthage, Missouri) — Carthage, Missouri
Carthage Senior High School (Carthage, New York) — Carthage, New York
Carthage High School (Carthage, Texas) — Carthage, Texas